Chalcopteroides is a genus of darkling beetle, defined by Embrik Strand in 1935, and replacing the older name Chalcopterus which was preoccupied. The type species is Chalcopterus iridicolor.

References

Tenebrionidae genera
Taxa named by Embrik Strand